Shruti Naidu is an Indian film actor and producer known for her works in Kannada cinema.

Personal life
She is the only child to her parents. Her father is Janardhana Naidu, a bank manager. Her mother is Susheela Belawadi, also a bank manager, and a relative to Prakash Belawadi.

Career
In her early career she assisted TV commercials producer M.G. Sathya. She was part of serial ′Preethi Illadha Mele′ on ETV. She has directed Kannada television soaps/serials like ′Brahmagantu′, ′Shri Asthu Shubham Asthu′, ′Punarvivaha′ and ′Mahadevi′.

Filmography
 Premier Padmini (2019) (as producer)

Television
List of television daily soaps produced by Shruti Naidu, under Shruti Naidu Chitra Production are:

References

External links
Official website

Living people
Kannada film producers
Film producers from Karnataka
Year of birth missing (living people)